The Second Time Around is the second studio album by the American blues artist Etta James. The album was released in 1961 on Argo Records. It was produced by Phil and Leonard Chess, who also produced her previous album. Riley Hampton was the arranger and orchestra conductor.

Background
The Second Time Around was originally released by Argo Records as a 12-inch LP, containing five tracks on each side of the LP (with ten tracks overall). Like her previous album, At Last!, the producers, Phil and Leonard Chess, added orchestral strings to the background music of James's voice, which garnered Pop crossover appeal. The album spawned three singles: "Don't Cry Baby" (#6), "The Fool That I Am" (#14) and "Seven Day Fool" (#95), which all became major hits on the Hot Rhythm Blues Records and Billboard Pop Chart in 1961. The album includes covers of pop and jazz standards such as, "Dream." The album was re-issued as a compact disc on MCA/Chess in 1999, however unlike her previous album which was also re-issued, The Second Time Around did not include any additional bonus tracks.

The AllMusic reviewer, Richie Unterberger, gave the album a positive review, awarding it four out of five stars.

Track listing
Side one

Side two

Chart positions
Singles - Billboard (United States)

References

1961 albums
Etta James albums
MCA Records albums
Chess Records albums
Argo Records albums